Sergeant Nathaniel C. Barker (September 28, 1836 – March 7, 1904) was an American soldier who fought in the American Civil War. Barker was awarded the country's highest award for bravery during combat, the Medal of Honor, for his action in Spotsylvania County, Virginia, during the Battle of Spotsylvania on May 12, 1864. He was presented with the award on 23 September 1897.

Biography
Barker enlisted into the 11th New Hampshire Regiment Volunteer Infantry Company E on 21 August 1862. During the Battle of Spotsylvania six of the color bearers of Barker's company were killed on May 12, considered the bloodiest day of the battle. Barker took the regiment's two flags and advanced with them the rest of duration of the battle.

Barker was wounded on 7 June 1864 in Cold Harbor, Virginia and was later discharged from duty on 25 May 1865. He is buried at Last Rest Cemetery in Merrimack, New Hampshire.

Medal of Honor citation

See also

List of American Civil War Medal of Honor recipients: A–F

References

External links
 

1836 births
1904 deaths
People of New Hampshire in the American Civil War
Union Army soldiers
United States Army Medal of Honor recipients
American Civil War recipients of the Medal of Honor
People from Grafton County, New Hampshire